Sergei Vladimirovich Kotov (born 17 March 1982) is a Russian professional football coach and a former player. He is the goalkeeping coach for FC Dynamo-2 Moscow.

Playing career
He made his debut in the Russian Premier League in 2002 for FC Saturn-RenTV Ramenskoye.

Coaching career
On 9 January 2020 he was promoted to the position of the goalkeeping coach with the Under-20 squad of FC Dynamo Moscow.

References

1982 births
Living people
People from Kamyshin
Russian footballers
FC Tekstilshchik Kamyshin players
FC Khimki players
FC Saturn Ramenskoye players
FC Zvezda Irkutsk players
FC Salyut Belgorod players
Russian Premier League players
FC Gornyak Uchaly players
FC Arsenal Tula players
Association football goalkeepers
FC Chernomorets Novorossiysk players
FC Spartak-2 Moscow players
FC Dynamo Makhachkala players
Sportspeople from Volgograd Oblast